Sibelius is a scorewriter program developed and released by Sibelius Software Limited (now part of Avid Technology).  It is the world's largest selling music notation program.  Beyond creating, editing and printing music scores, it can also play the music back using sampled or synthesised sounds.  It produces printed scores, and can also publish them via the Internet for others to access. Less advanced versions of Sibelius at lower prices have been released, as have various add-ons for the software.

Named after the Finnish composer Jean Sibelius, the company was founded in April 1993 by twin brothers Ben and Jonathan Finn to market the eponymous music notation program they had created. It went on to develop and distribute various other music software products, particularly for education. In addition to its head office in Cambridge and subsequently London, Sibelius Software opened offices in the US, Australia and Japan, with distributors and dealers in many other countries worldwide. The company won numerous awards, including the Queen's Award for Innovation in 2005.

In August 2006 the company was acquired by Avid, to become part of its Digidesign division, which also manufactures the digital audio workstation Pro Tools.  In July 2012, Avid announced plans to divest its consumer businesses, closed the Sibelius London office, and removed the original development team, despite a 12,000 strong Change.org 'Save Sibelius' petition spearheading a campaign led by Derek Williams that included extensive protests on Facebook and elsewhere. Avid subsequently recruited some new programmers to continue development of Sibelius, and Steinberg hired most of the former Sibelius team to create a competing software, Dorico.

History

Origins
Sibelius was originally developed by British twins Jonathan and Ben Finn for the Acorn Archimedes computer under the name 'Sibelius 7', not as a version number, but reminiscent of Sibelius' Symphony No 7. The Finns said they could not remember why they used Jean Sibelius' name, but it was probably because he was also ‘a Finn' (i.e. Finnish), as well as being one of their favourite composers. Development in assembly language on the RISC OS started in 1986 after they left school, and continued while they were at Oxford and Cambridge universities, respectively. Both were music students, and said they wrote the program because they did not like the laborious process of writing music by hand.

The program was released to the public in April 1993 on 3.5-inch floppy disk. It required considerably less than 1 MB of memory (as its files only occupied a few KB per page of music), and the combination of assembly language and the Archimedes' ARM processor meant that it ran very quickly. No matter how long the score, changes were displayed almost instantly. A unique feature of the Sibelius GUI at that time was the ability it gave the user to drag the entire score around with the mouse, offering a bird's eye of the score, as distinct from having to use the QWERTY input keyboard arrow keys, or equivalent, to scroll the page.

The first ever user of Sibelius was the composer and engraver Richard Emsley, who provided advice on music engraving prior to the start of development, and beta tested the software before its release. The first concert performance from a Sibelius score was of an orchestral work by David Robert Coleman, copied by Emsley. The first score published using Sibelius was Antara by George Benjamin, also copied by Emsley, and published by Faber Music. Other early adopters included composer John Rutter, conductor Michael Tilson Thomas, and publisher Music Sales.

As a killer application for the niche Acorn platform, Sibelius rapidly dominated the UK market. It also sold in smaller numbers in a few other countries, restricted by the availability of Acorn computers. 'Lite' versions were subsequently released, and these were successful in UK schools, where Acorns were widely used.

Expansion
In September 1998, the first version for Windows was released as 'Sibelius', with the version number reset to 1.0. A Mac version 1.2 was released a few months later, and the company thereafter used conventional version numbers for both platforms across subsequent upgrades. Scores created on one platform could be opened on the other, and were backward compatible. To produce these versions, the software was completely rewritten in C++, while retaining most of the original's functionality and user interface with numerous enhancements. The original Acorn names 'Sibelius 6' and 'Sibelius 7' were later re-used to denote versions 6 and 7 of Sibelius for Windows/Mac.

Releasing Sibelius for more widely available computers brought it to a worldwide market, particularly the US, where Sibelius Software had opened an office in late 1996. Following the break-up of Acorn Computers shortly after Sibelius' Windows release, no further Acorn versions were developed. Sibelius Software later opened an office in Australia, also serving New Zealand, where Sibelius was widely used.

In August 2006, Sibelius Software Ltd was acquired by Avid Technology, an American manufacturer of software and hardware for audio and video production. Avid continued publishing Sibelius as a stand-alone notation product, as well as integrating it with some of its existing software products.

In July 2012, Avid announced plans to divest itself of its other consumer businesses, closed the Sibelius London office, and laid off the original development team, amid an outpouring of user protest, then recruited a new team of programmers to continue Sibelius development in Montreal, Canada and Kyiv, Ukraine.

Timeline
 1986: Founders Jonathan and Ben Finn start designing Sibelius 7 for Acorn computers.
 1993: Sibelius Software founded to sell Sibelius 7 and related computer hardware/software in the UK. Early customers include Europe's largest publisher Music Sales, choral composer John Rutter, and the Royal Academy of Music. Sibelius 6 (educational version) also launched.
 1994: Distribution in Europe, Australia and New Zealand commences. Sibelius 7 Student (educational version) launched.
 1995: German versions of Sibelius launched.
 1996: US office opened in California. Junior Sibelius (primary school program) launched.
 1998: Sibelius for Windows launched worldwide. Company ceases selling hardware to concentrate on core software business.
 1999: Sibelius for Mac, PhotoScore and Scorch launched. Sibelius forms US subsidiary, creating the Sibelius Group, which now has 25 employees. Quester VCT invests.
 2000: Sibelius Internet Edition launched, and adopted for Internet publishing by leading European publishers Music Sales and Boosey & Hawkes. SibeliusMusic.com and Sibelius Notes (initially called Teaching Tools) launched.
 2001: World's largest sheet music publisher Hal Leonard also adopts Sibelius Internet Edition. Sibelius Group reaches 50 employees.
 2002: Sibelius is first major music program for Mac OS X. Company acquires music software company MIDIworks.
 2003: Revenues beat competitor MakeMusic Inc. by 20%, confirming Sibelius as world market leader. Starclass, Instruments, G7 and G7music.net launched. Sibelius Group commences distributing Musition and Auralia. Sibelius in Japanese launched, distributed by Yamaha.
 2004: Compass, Kontakt Gold, Sibelius Student Edition, Sibelius in French and Spanish launched. Company acquires SequenceXtra. Sibelius software used in more than 50% of UK secondary schools.
 2005: Australian subsidiary formed after acquiring Australian distributor. Company reaches 75 employees. Wins prestigious Queen's Award for Innovation. Releases Rock & Pop Collection of sounds. Commences distributing O-Generator.
 2006: Groovy Music and Coloured Keyboard launched. Sibelius Software bought by Avid Technology.
 2007: Japanese office opened.
 2012: Avid closes Sibelius' London office and lays off original development team, sparking the 'Save Sibelius' campaign.
 2014: First release of a Sibelius version (7.5) by the new development team.
 2018: Sibelius First (free, entry-level product), Sibelius (formerly Sibelius First) and Sibelius Ultimate (formerly Sibelius) launched together with a new year-based versioning system.
 2021: Sibelius for iPad and iPhone is released.

Features

Core functionality
Sibelius' main function is to help create, edit and print musical scores. It supports virtually all music notations, enabling even the most complex of modern orchestral, choral, jazz, pop, folk, rock and chamber music scores to be engraved to publication quality. Further, it allows scores to be played back or turned into MIDI or audio files, e.g. to create a CD. A built-in sample player and a large range of sampled sounds are included. It supports any MIDI device, and allows Virtual Studio Technology (VST) and Audio Units plug-ins to be used as playback instruments, giving users access to third-party sample libraries. Score playback can also be synchronised to video, or to DAW software via the ReWire standard.

By default, Sibelius plays a brief passage from a Jean Sibelius symphony as it launches, a feature that can be disabled in the application's Preferences if desired. Each version has used a different excerpt; e.g. Sibelius 7 appropriately uses the main theme from Sibelius' 7th Symphony.

In Version 7.0, Avid Technology rebuilt Sibelius as a 64-bit application, replacing the menu navigation system of previous versions with a Ribbon interface in the process.  This met with considerable user resistance, however the Ribbon remains integral to the current GUI.

Add-ons
Add-ons for Sibelius that are currently or have previously been available include:
 Sound libraries such as Note Performer, Vienna Symphonic Library, Kontakt, Garritan, and Mark of the Unicorn's (MOTU) Symphonic Instrument, which can be added as Manual Sound Sets in the Playback Devices options from the Sibelius Play tab.
 Extra plug-in features. These are usually free of charge, and often created by Sibelius users, the most prolific of whom has been Bob Zawalich.
 Myriad's PDF to MusicXML transcribing application PDFtoMusic.
 Neuratron's Music OCR program PhotoScore (scanning), which can be used to scan and create a Sibelius score from printed music and PDF documents. A lite version is bundled with Sibelius.
 Neuratron's AudioScore, also bundled in a lite version, which claims to be able to turn singing or an acoustic instrument performance into a score, though many users have complained that this does not work. AudioScore currently holds a two-star rating on cnet.com.
 QWERTY Keyboards such as Logic Keyboard.
 Keyboard covers such as KB Covers.
 Mobile device VNC controllers such as iPad Sibelius Wizard and Sibelius Control for iPad, allowing the user to control Sibelius wirelessly via shortcuts set up within the Preferences.

Cloud publishing
Sibelius users can publish their scores directly from the software via the Internet using desktops, laptops or iPads. Anyone else using software called Sibelius Scorch (free for web browsers, charged for on iPads) can then view these scores, play them back, transpose them, change instruments, or print them from the web browser version. ScoreExchange.com is a website where any Sibelius user can upload scores they have composed, arranged or transcribed with Sibelius, so that anyone can access the music. The site began in 2001 as SibeliusMusic.com, and by June 2011 had amassed nearly 100,000 scores. The iPad version of Scorch also includes a store containing over 250,000 scores from publishers Music Sales, Hal Leonard, and Sibelius Scorch is used in the websites of various music publishers and individual musicians. Publishers can licence the Sibelius Internet Edition for commercial online publishing.

From October 2017, Scorch has been replaced by Sibelius Cloud Publishing, providing publishers with an API to automate the publishing and selling of digital sheet Music. It uses the same technology as Scorch to allow Sibelius users to share music online directly from within the program, and addresses compatibility issues.

Education
There are various education-specific features for Sibelius' large market of schools and universities. The Sibelius Educational Suite includes extensive built-in music teaching materials, and the ability to run and manage multiple copies of the software on a network at discounted educational pricing.

In 2012, Sibelius Student was replaced by a new version of Sibelius First.

Lite notation based on Sibelius is included in Avid's Pro Tools audio editing software.

Network
A network licence is available for schools, colleges, universities and other multi-client situations.

Awards
Numerous awards for the software include:
 2005 Queen's Awards for Enterprise - Innovation (Sibelius Software Ltd); Parents' Choice Award - Silver Award Winner (Sibelius Student); Parents' Choice Award for (Sibelius 3)
 2006 Music Industry Awards - Best Music Software (Sibelius 4)

See also
 List of scorewriters
 List of music software

References

External links
 

Scorewriters
RISC OS software
Assembly language software
Petitions
Social media campaigns
Music publishing
Things named after Jean Sibelius